Goffredo Cognetti (Naples 1855 - Castiglioncello, Livorno 1943) was an Italian writer.

Works
Mala vita, verismo play with Salvatore Di Giacomo, one which the opera Mala vita was based. 
Scene popolari napoletane (1889) -on which the opera A Santa Lucia was based
O voto 1889 play on which the opera A basso porto was based

References

1855 births
1943 deaths